The Stamford Raffles Award is an award of the Zoological Society of London. It is "For distinguished contributions to zoology by amateur zoologists or professional zoologists in recognition of contributions which are outside the scope of their professional activities." The first awards were sculptures by Henry Moore called 'Animal Form', followed later by sculptures called 'Young Hippo' by Anita Mandl.

List of awardees

20th century
 Source: ZSL

1961 Dr W. S. Bristowe for contributions to arachnology
1962 Dr. Reginald Ernest Moreau for contributions to ornithology
1963 Cyril Winthrop Mackworth Praed for contributions to ornithology
1964 Claud William Wright for contributions to palaeontology
1965 Dr Ernest Neal for contributions to mammalogy and entomology
1966 The Reverend Edward Allworthy Armstrong for contributions to ornithology
1967 Dr Maxwell Savage for contributions to knowledge of the amphibians
1968 Guy Mountfort for his contributions to the study of natural history
1969 Rex A. Jubb for contributions to southern African ichthyology
1970 Donovan Reginald Rosevear in recognition of contributions to knowledge of West African mammalian fauna
1971 Beryl Patricia Hall for work on the taxonomy and zoogeography of African birds
1972 Dr Lionel George Higgins for outstanding contributions to knowledge of Lepidoptera
1973 George Hazlewood "Ted" Locket for contributions to arachnology
1974 Arthur Erskine Ellis for contributions to the study of molluscs
1975 Lieutenant-Colonel John Nevill Eliot for distinguished taxonomic work on Lepidoptera, particularly the family Lycaenidae
1977 Stanley Cramp for contributions to ornithology
1978 Jonathan Kingdon for contributions to the study of East African mammals
1979 Stella Turk for contributions to the study of seahorse life and marine molluscs
1980 Dr Edward H. Eason for distinguished work on the taxonomy of centipedes
1981 Lt.-Col. A. Maitland Emmet for work on Microlepidoptera
1982 Mr R. Moylan Gambles for distinguished work on Odonata
1983 Major Michael Gallagher for contributions to the ornithology of Arabia
1984 Dr Walter J. Le Quesne for distinguished contribution to the taxonomy and biology of Hemiptera
1985 Dr A. Frank Millidge for distinguished contributions to arachnology
1987 Miss Fiona Guiness for contributions to research on red deer in the British Isles
1988 Mr William Frank Harding Ansell for contribution to knowledge of the taxonomy and distribution of African mammals
1989 Major Kenneth W. England for contribution to the taxonomy of tropical sea-anemones
1990 Dr David L. Harrison for distinguished contribution to the study of mammals
1992 Dr J. Denis Summers-Smith for world-renowned work on sparrows
1993 Dr William R. P. Bourne for contribution to the study of seabirds
1994 Mrs J. Hall-Crags for long-standing contributions to the description of bird song
1996 Mrs Norma Chapman for outstanding contribution to the knowledge of deer in Britain
1998 Dr Clive Carefoot for outstanding research on plumage genetics
1999 Mr Edward Max Nicholson for lifelong contributions to conservation

21st century

2001 Dr Norman Moore for research on the ecology and behaviour of dragonflies
2002 Thomas Jones Roberts for furthering our understanding of wildlife in Pakistan
2003 Christopher du Feu for contributions to ornithology
2005 Peter Grubb for contributions to mammalian systematics
2006 Peter Chandler for contributions to our knowledge of European Diptera
2007 Ted Benton for contributions to our knowledge on bees, butterflies and dragonflies
2009 Bob Swann for contributions to ornithology
2010 Richard Lewington for contributions for wildlife illustration
2011 Dan Danahar for contributions towards the advancement of biodiversity education
2012 Stephen Petty for significant long-term monitoring and data collection that has contributed to our understanding of the ecology of tawny owl populations, their vole prey and other raptors
2013 David Mallon for significant contributions to antelope conservation
2014 Elise Andrew for significant contributions to science communication
2015 Nick Tregenza for outstanding contributions to acoustic monitoring of cetaceans
2016 Malcolm Tait for outstanding contributions to the public appreciation of wildlife  
2017 Paul Brock for outstanding contributions to entomology

Notes

See also

 List of biology awards

References

External links
Zoological Society of London
Reginald Ernest Moreau's Stamford Raffles Award of 1962, sold for £50,000 in June 2016 (Christie's)

Biology awards
Zoology
British science and technology awards
Awards established in 1961